Doms in Sudan speak the Domari language. They immigrated to the territory of the present day Sudan from South Asia, particularly from India, in Byzantine times. Dom and Nawar people self-segregated themselves for centuries from the dominant culture of Sudan, who view Romani as dishonorable though clever. Historically, Gypsies in Sudan have provided musical entertainment as weddings and other celebrations. The Romani people or Gypsies in Sudan include subgroups like Nawar, Halebi and Ghagar.

See also
Romani people in Egypt
Romani people in Libya
Romani people in Syria
Romani people in Iraq
Nawar people

References

External links
The Gypsies of Sudan  , Dom Research Center

Ethnic groups in Sudan
Dom in Africa
Dom people